Kevin Goudreau (born in 1975 or 1976) is a Canadian white nationalist and the chairman of the Canadian Nationalist Front.

Activities 
Goudreau is the chairman of the Canadian Nationalist Front, previously known as the White Nationalist Front, a white nationalist and far-right group. In 2017, he opposed Prime Minister Justin Trudeau's immigration policy, and in September 2017, organised an anti-immigration protest in Peterborough, Ontario. In 2019, a court imposed a peace bond on Goudreau after his social media posts encouraged people to kill members of the Canadian Anti-Hate Network. The same year, his Facebook and Twitter accounts were shut down as part of wider actions taken by the companies to remove extremist accounts.

Goudreau was charged by police of uttering threats in April and in May 2022. The first charge relates to alleged harassment towards his LGBT neighbours.

Personal life 
Goudreau has a tattoo of a gun and a swastika on his chest. Online photographs show him giving a Nazi salute. He has been described as a neo-Nazi by Vice News and local news outlet KawarthaNow. 

He was aged 46 in 2022, and lives in Peterborough.

See also 

 Neo-Nazism in Canada

References

External links 

 Kevin Goudreau, self portrait showing tattoo, Flickr

1970s births
Canadian white nationalists
Organization founders
People from Peterborough, Ontario
Living people